Ye Aung (born 8 June 1960) is a Burmese military officer who served as Minister for Border Affairs of Myanmar from 2018 to 2021 and sits on the National Defence and Security Council.

Early life and education 
Ye Aung was born on 8 June 1960 in Chauk, Magwe Division, Burma (now Myanmar) to Ba Saw and Khin Kyi.

Career 

Ye Aung graduated from the 23rd intake of the Defence Services Academy with a Bachelor's and master's degree in defence. He previously served as a military judicial advocate, and holds the rank of Lieutenant General

Personal life 
He married Khaing May Kyu, and has two sons, Thu Sit Aung and Thu Yan Nyein.

References 

Living people
Government ministers of Myanmar
1960 births
People from Magway Division
Specially Designated Nationals and Blocked Persons List
Individuals related to Myanmar sanctions